Farnstädt is a municipality in the Saalekreis district, Saxony-Anhalt, Germany. Since 1 January 2010 Alberstedt has been incorporated.

References

 

Saalekreis